Keith Edwards (born 1947) is an Australian former rugby league footballer who played in the 1960s and 1970s.

Playing career
A local junior, Edwards played for the South Sydney Rabbitohs for six seasons between 1969 and 1975. He is best remembered as a winger in the victorious 1971 Grand Final team.
He retired at the conclusion of the 1975 season.

References

South Sydney Rabbitohs players
Australian rugby league players
Living people
1947 births
Rugby league wingers
Date of birth missing (living people)
Rugby league players from Sydney